Brickellia brandegei is a Mexican species of flowering plants in the family Asteraceae. It is native to western Mexico from the states of Sonora and Baja California Sur (including Isla Espíritu Santo).

References

brandegei
Flora of Northwestern Mexico
Plants described in 1838